Roger Wang (born 1948/49) is a Chinese-American businessman. He is the chairman and former chief executive officer (CEO) of the Golden Eagle International Group.

Early life and education
In 1948, Wang was born in mainland China.

In 1970, Wang immigrated from Taiwan to the United States. In 1973, Wang earned a MBA degree from Southeastern Louisiana University.

Career
Wang returned to China in 1992 and founded the Golden Eagle International Group in Nanjing, starting by building a tower and opening a department store. The company became a conglomerate specializing in many things ranging from real estate development and automotive maintenance. He founded the Golden Eagle Retail Group in 1995 to operate department stores within China, particularly Jiangsu province; the retail Group became public on the Hong Kong Stock Exchange in 2006, ticker 3308, with Wang as the main shareholder.

He was featured in Forbes' List of billionaires (2007) and ''The Forbes 400 Richest Americans.

As of August 2016, Wang is the chairman of Golden Eagle. He is the former CEO, and Su Kai has been CEO since August 2014.

He is one of the Executive Board Members of The U.S. – China Policy Foundation.

In 2019 a residential building owned by Wang, located in the Arts District neighborhood of Los Angeles was placed into the Rent Escrow Account Program. The Rent Escrow Account Program (R.E.A.P.) is a program of "last resort" designed to protect renters from slumlords that refuse to repair substandard housing in the city of Los Angeles. In July of 2020 roughly 20 tenants in his apartment building collectively filed a lawsuit alleging tenant harassment, breach of the warranty of habitability and intentional infliction of emotional distress among other causes of action. The case's outcome is pending a trial scheduled for 2023.

Philanthropy
Wang made a large charitable contribution to The Huntington Library in San Marino, California.

Awards 
 2009 Alumnus of the Year. Presented by Southeastern Louisiana University.

Personal life
In 1978, Wang was naturalized as a United States citizen.

Wang's wife is Vivine Wang. They have two daughters, Janice and Dorothy Wang. He splits his time between China and Beverly Hills, California.

References

1948 births
Living people
Taiwanese billionaires
Taiwanese businesspeople
Taiwanese emigrants to the United States
Southeastern Louisiana University alumni
Chinese Civil War refugees
American retail chief executives
Philanthropists from California
Members of Committee of 100
American billionaires
People associated with the Huntington Library
Naturalized citizens of the United States